Hans Friedemann Goetze (3 November 1897 – 27 May 1940) was a Nazi Standartenführer (Colonel) of the German Waffen-SS and commander of SS Heimwehr Danzig (Danzig Home Defence). He was a son of SS-Brigadeführer Friedemann Goetze. He was shot and killed by a British sniper while leading Infanterie Regiment 3 of the 3rd SS Division Totenkopf near Le Paradis.

About 1550 members of the SS Heimwehr Danzig took part in an attack on the Polish Post Office in Danzig. On 8 September 1939, members of the SS Heimwehr Danzig killed 33 Polish civilians in the village of Ksiazki.

From April 1939 to April 1940 some members of his military unit took part in a mass murder near the Forest of Szpęgawsk.

Summary of his military career

Dates of rank

 SS-Hauptsturmführer - 15 May 1937
 SS-Sturmbannführer - 12 September 1937
 SS-Obersturmbannführer - 20 April 1939
 SS-Standartenführer - 1 September 1939

Notable decorations
 Honour Cross of the World War 1914/1918
 Wound Badge in Black
 Iron Cross Second Class
 Iron Cross First Class
 Baltic Cross
 Reichs Sport Badge in Gold
 Clasp to the Iron Cross Second Class
 Horsemans Badge in Bronze
 Danzig Cross, 1st and 2nd Class
 SA Sport Badge

References

1897 births
1940 deaths
People from Rendsburg
SS-Standartenführer
Waffen-SS personnel killed in action
Recipients of the Iron Cross (1914), 1st class
Recipients of the clasp to the Iron Cross, 2nd class
Deaths by firearm in France
Nazi war criminals